Delorme, also known as Edgarton, is an unincorporated community in Mingo County, West Virginia, United States. Delorme is located along the Tug Fork across from the state of Kentucky.

It was formerly served by the Norfolk and Western Railway and reportedly once had as many as seven bars.

References

Unincorporated communities in Mingo County, West Virginia
Unincorporated communities in West Virginia